The Y-class was a one-member tram class built by the Melbourne & Metropolitan Tramways Board. It entered service in September 1927 initially operating a 24-mile tourist service, before being used on regular services on the Burwood line and all night services from Camberwell depot in company with the Y1-class.

In 1965, it was transferred to Glenhuntly depot to avoid running into the city due to a lack of number boxes. It was withdrawn in April 1965 and retained as a driver training car.

It has been preserved as part of the VicTrack heritage fleet at Hawthorn depot.

References

Melbourne tram vehicles
600 V DC multiple units